Eocathayornis is a genus of enantiornithean birds that was probably more basal or "primitive" than related genera Sinornis and Cathayornis. These birds lived during the Early Cretaceous in today's People's Republic of China.

The holotype IVPP 10916 was in 1994 found in the Boluochi quarry by Zhou Zhonghe in a layer of the Jiufotang Formation dating from the late Aptian. It consists of the skull and the top half of the postcranial skeleton on a plate and counterplate. The bones have only been preserved as impressions. In 2002, Zhou named and described the type species Eocathayornis walkeri. The generic name combines a Greek ἠώς, eos, "dawn", with Cathayornis, referring to the more basal build compared to the latter genus. The specific name honours Cyril Alexander Walker for his contributions to the study of the Enantiornithes.

Zhou in 2002 placed Eocathayornis in the Cathayornithidae.

References

Bird genera
Early Cretaceous birds of Asia
Euenantiornitheans
Fossils of China
Fossil taxa described in 2002